Jared Perry (born August 27, 1988) is a former American football wide receiver. He was signed by the San Francisco 49ers as an undrafted free agent in 2010. He played college football at Missouri.

Perry has also been a member of the Philadelphia Eagles. He was the AFL Rookie of the Year in 2012. Perry joined the Arizona Rattlers in 2013, helping the Rattlers to their second straight ArenaBowl title.

On April 15, 2014, Perry was placed on reassignment by the Rattlers, and was claimed the next day by the Iowa Barnstormers. After refusing to report to the Barnstormers, Perry was traded back to Arizona for Louis Nzegwu. On May 6, 2014, Perry was traded to Iowa for Nzegwu. On May 12, 2014, Perry was traded back to the Rattlers for Future Considerations.

On April 10, 2015, Perry was placed on reassignment by the Rattlers. On April 11, 2015, he was claimed by the Portland Thunder.

References

External links
Chicago Rush bio
Missouri Tigers bio

1988 births
Living people
American football wide receivers
Missouri Tigers football players
Chicago Rush players
Arizona Rattlers players
Iowa Barnstormers players
Portland Thunder players
Portland Steel players
Players of American football from Texas
People from La Marque, Texas